Andrew Jarecki (born March 24, 1963) is an American filmmaker, musician, and entrepreneur.  He is best known for the Emmy-winning 2015 documentary series The Jinx: The Life and Deaths of Robert Durst.  He is also known for the documentary film Capturing the Friedmans, which won eighteen international prizes including the Grand Jury Prize at the Sundance Film Festival and the New York Film Critics Circle award, and was nominated for an Academy Award.  He also co-founded Moviefone and created the KnowMe iOS platform.

Career
Jarecki graduated from Princeton University in 1985. He is the co-founder and CEO of Moviefone, which provides film schedules over the Internet and telephone and was sold to AOL in 1999. With producer J. J. Abrams, Jarecki co-wrote the theme song to Felicity, "New Version of You", in 2000.

Jarecki's 2003 documentary about a family, Capturing the Friedmans, his first feature, began as an offshoot from a short film he was making about birthday party clowns, which was titled Just a Clown and released in 2004.  Jarecki went on to direct the narrative feature All Good Things starring Ryan Gosling, Kirsten Dunst, and Frank Langella. The film, inspired by the life of millionaire Robert Durst and the unsolved disappearance of his wife Kathie, was released in 2010. Along with filmmaking partner Marc Smerling, Jarecki also produced the 2010 documentary film Catfish, and co-produced and directed the documentary miniseries The Jinx, which aired on HBO in 2015. Jarecki plays the drums and sings backing vocals on Bikini Robot Army's single "Joe Strummer's House".

Jarecki directed the 2018 Netflix comedy series Bumping Mics with Jeff Ross & Dave Attell.

Personal life
Jarecki is the son of financier-philanthropist Henry Jarecki, the brother of documentary filmmaker Eugene Jarecki, and the half-brother of filmmaker Nicholas Jarecki.
Andrew lives in New York City with his wife, Nancy Jarecki, and their 3 kids.

Filmography

References

External links

An interview with Jarecki
British Film Institute interview
NPR interview

Living people
American documentary filmmakers
American people of German-Jewish descent
Princeton University alumni
Hackley School alumni
1963 births